Patrick Ricard may refer to:

Patrick Ricard (American football) (born 1994), American football player
Patrick Ricard (entrepreneur) (1945–2012), French entrepreneur